Bourák is a 2020 Czech gangster romantic comedy film directed by Ondřej Trojan. It stars Ivan Trojan.

Plot
The film is set in a fictional town Šlukdorf. Bourák is an auto mechanic who loves music and dance and refuses to "grow up." His daughter Kamila becomes fed up with life in Šlukdorf and her fathers irresponsibility.

Cast
 Ivan Trojan as Bourák
 Veronika Marková as Kamila
 Kristýna Boková as Markéta
 Jiří Macháček as Ruda
 Kateřina Winterová as Elvíra
 Petra Nesvačilová as Jiřina
 Jaromír Dulava as Luděk

References

External links
 
 Bourák at CSFD.cz 

2020 films
Czech comedy films
Czech musical films
Czech romantic films
Czech gangster films
2020s Czech-language films
2020 romantic comedy films